"Back Up Buddy" is a song written by Boudleaux Bryant, sung by Carl Smith, and released on the Columbia label (catalog no. 21226). In May 1954, it peaked at No. 2 on the Billboard country and western chart. It was also ranked No. 17 on Billboards 1954 year-end country and western retail chart.

See also
 Billboard Top Country & Western Records of 1954

References

American country music songs
1954 songs